Big Dan is a 1923 American drama film directed by William A. Wellman and written by Frederic Hatton and Fanny Hatton. The film stars Buck Jones, Marian Nixon, Ben Hendricks Jr., Trilby Clark, Jacqueline Gadsden, and Charles Coleman. The film was released on October 14, 1923, by Fox Film Corporation.

Cast

Preservation
A complete print of Big Dan is held in the UCLA Film and Television Archive.

References

External links

1923 films
1920s English-language films
Silent American drama films
1923 drama films
Fox Film films
Films directed by William A. Wellman
American silent feature films
American black-and-white films
1920s American films